Macy Alexander is a fictional character in the American soap opera The Bold and the Beautiful. Bobbie Eakes played the role from April 1989 to July 2000, briefly in August 2001, and again from December 2002 to October 2003. Macy was introduced as the daughter of Sally Spectra, with many of her storylines revolving around her relationship with Thorne Forrester, whom she has been married to three times. Other storylines have revolved around her relationships with both her paternal and maternal family, and various other men, including Grant Chambers, Lorenzo Barelli and Deacon Sharpe.

Storylines
Macy first met Thorne Forrester (Clayton Norcross) in a bar as she was walking out while he bumped into her. The second time they met was on the Queen Mary, where the Spectras and the Forresters were having a fashion showdown (now Jeff Trachta). Her mother Sally (Darlene Conley) had been trying to arrange for Macy to end up with Ridge (Ronn Moss), but it was Ridge's brother Thorne who walked into the room and caught Macy coming out of the shower. It was a while before they ran into each other again at the Bikini Bar, each nursing their own broken heart—Thorne for his soon-to-be-ex-wife Caroline (Joanna Johnson), and Macy for Mick Savage, a photographer who had run out on her. They spent the night together at Big Bear, but neither intended for it to be more until they cohosted a benefit together and discovered they both loved singing. After dating for some time, Thorne proposed to Macy, but there was one problem - Macy had never told Thorne that she was Sally Spectra's daughter because the Forresters would never have accepted the truth. Macy accepted Thorne's proposal, but while telling her mother, Sally revealed that Eye on Fashion had a picture of Clarke (Daniel McVicar) and Sally's wedding, which included Macy. When Thorne, who had found out from his family, confronted her, she admitted who she was and returned the ring. Macy was heartbroken to have lost Thorne, but within a few weeks, Thorne's first wife Caroline died and Thorne, with Sally's help, came back to Macy begging for another shot.

Their wedding plans didn't go as smoothly as they wanted. While Macy's family supported them, only Thorne's sister Felicia (then played by Colleen Dion-Scotti) was willing to be part of their wedding. Macy and Thorne decided to have a church ceremony, and they were pleasantly surprised when Thorne's entire family showed up. Unfortunately, the Forresters could not truly accept Macy as Thorne's wife, and Macy and Thorne were constantly arguing over what her mother was up to, and the two separated. After waiting in vain for Thorne to come to her (he was waiting for the same thing), Macy got involved with tennis pro Jake Maclaine (Todd McKee), who had recently broken up with Felicia. Thorne finally came to her and asked her to come back, but by then it had been too long, and Macy opted to stay with Jake. It wasn't long before she regretted her decision and went home to Thorne, who welcomed her back with open arms. Their happiness didn't last long, because they couldn't stop the fighting and Thorne soon fell for Karen (also played by Joanna Johnson), the long-lost twin of his first love, Caroline.

During her relationship with Jake, Macy was accused of stealing the BeLieF formula from Forrester. Jake eventually confessed to the crime, spurring him and his sister into leaving town. Macy and Thorne again reunited, only this time Anthony Armando (Michael Sabatino) came between them ... that, and Macy's alcoholism. When model Ivana (Monika Schnarre) was found dead, Thorne was accused of the crime, but it turned out it was Anthony. When Macy and Thorne began singing together again, they once again renewed their relationship. Although they hit a bump in the road with Macy's throat cancer, it wasn't long before the two married yet again. When Thorne got himself involved with Claudia Cortéz (Lilly Melgar), a Forrester employee who was in the country illegally, it was the last straw, and Macy and Thorne's already tenuous relationship broke. Macy threw herself into trying to get over Thorne, and while she was trying to do that, she was making friends with Grant Chambers (Charles Grant), a new designer at Spectra. Almost before they knew it, she and Grant were in love, and planning a wedding.

For the first time in her life, there was no stress in Macy's relationship. Without needing to worry that the Forresters would disapprove of her or that Thorne (now Winsor Harmon) would disapprove of her mother, Macy and Grant could simply enjoy their time together. The two were blissfully in love, and planning a family and a future. When Macy was having trouble getting pregnant, they decided to go to the doctor for tests, and while there, Macy and Grant were treated to a shock—Grant had cancer, and he didn't have long to live. Macy was devastated to learn that she had found the love of her life but would soon lose him. Macy stayed by his side for the remaining time he had left, but when Grant died, she turned back to the bottle. Thorne (who had given up on his quest for Ridge's wife Taylor) was there to help pull her out, and the two were soon back together, planning a wedding and a future. Unfortunately, Thorne's former sister-in-law Brooke had set her sights on Thorne, and Brooke worked behind the scenes until she came between Thorne and Macy, and the two broke up. Macy thought it was over until she got a call from Thorne, and assuming he and Brooke were finished, Macy married Thorne in Amsterdam.

Around this time, Macy's long-lost father showed up back in the picture, bringing with him his own teenage daughter Kimberly (Ashley Lyn Cafagna). Macy soon grew very close to both her father and her half-sister. Romantically, it wasn't long before Macy realized that Thorne had married her on the rebound and had no intention of stopping his relationship with Brooke Logan (Katherine Kelly Lang). She began to drink more heavily, which was not helped by Brooke flaunting her relationship with Thorne. Macy finally went up to Big Bear to say goodbye to Thorne and was ready to sign the divorce papers when Brooke arrived demanding that Macy let Thorne go so she could have him. Furious, Macy took off in the car, with Brooke tagging along so she could force her to sign the papers. After a horrible car accident, Macy was presumed dead, devastating her mother, half-sister and half-brother.

Thorne has a vision of Macy when he visits her grave in 2001. The following year, it was revealed that Macy is alive and well, as her father Adam (Michael Swan) had rescued her from the car moments before it blew up, and took her to Italy with him. While there, she under the name Lena, and fell in love with Lorenzo Barelli (Luigi Amodeo). She was noticed by Thorne when she was singing in a small Italian café, and when her mother Sally had a heart attack, she returned to Los Angeles with Lorenzo, who had become her husband. Thorne wasted no time in telling her that since she never signed the divorce papers they were still legally married, and after Macy realized she could never love Lorenzo the way she loved Thorne, Lorenzo left town and Macy and Thorne reunited. Unfortunately, at a time when he thought they were broken up, Thorne had indulged in a one-night stand with Macy's best friend and adoptive half-sister Darla (Schae Harrison). Around the same time Macy was having an emergency hysterectomy, Darla was discovering she was pregnant with Thorne's child. Although the plan was initially for Macy and Thorne to adopt the child (without Macy knowing Thorne was the father), once the truth came out Macy could no longer be part of Thorne's life and asked him for an annulment.

Macy found comfort in Deacon Sharpe (Sean Kanan), a new friend and recovering alcoholic. What started as friendship soon turned more romantic, especially once Macy began helping Deacon pursue custody of his son "little Eric" (Connor Carmody) and his daughter Hope Logan (Rachel and Amanda Pace). In part, Macy helped Deacon because by him winning, Brooke Logan would suffer, and Macy had never forgiven Brooke for manipulating her way into her and Thorne's marriage then tossing Thorne aside because he wasn't Ridge. Deacon and Macy married and began raising Eric (whom Deacon had won custody of) together, and things were finally back on track. When Oscar Marone (Brian Gaskill) opened a new nightclub in town, Macy agreed to perform on opening night, but enemies from Oscar's past tampered with the chandelier that night, which fell, severely injuring Macy. Although Macy hung on in the hospital in a coma for a few days, she never woke up, and her mother had to make the choice of whether or not to take her off life support; Sally's actual choice has never been revealed, but Macy is generally assumed to be dead, due to the funeral. When Thorne and Darla's daughter was born a few weeks later, she was named Alexandria in honor of Macy.

The Bold and the Beautiful characters
Female characters in television
Fictional singers
Television characters introduced in 1989